Owen is a solo project of Mike Kinsella, and part of the Chicago, Illinois indie rock scene.

Kinsella is one of the dominant and influential figures in the Chicago indie scene, having also led the band American Football, and played in the bands Cap'n Jazz, Joan of Arc, The One Up Downstairs and Owls, and most recently Their / They're / There. 

Owen is known for its soft melodies, complex acoustics, combining lead acoustics with keyboard and other guitars, plaintive vocals and drums. It can be seen as a natural progression for Kinsella, from the progressive and experimental severity of Joan of Arc via the more melodic-progressive American Football.

Career
Owen's debut, Owen was a stark departure from previous Mike Kinsella projects. For 2002's No Good For No One Now, Owen's second album, an arrangement of purchasing recording equipment instead of studio time was agreed upon. In 2004, in collaboration with Cale Parks (of Aloha), Bob Hoffnar, Jen Tabor, and Paul Koob, Mike began recording again. What resulted was (the ep). The joint effort marked a turning point of sorts for Owen. Rumors began to swirl that a live band would be taken on the road for the first time, but these rumors never materialized as Mike again rejoined Joan of Arc and became a touring member of both Maritime and Aloha. 
(the ep) had been written as a companion piece to a scheduled full-length. In summer 2004, Mike again began recording and collaborating, this time with cousin Nate Kinsella (Make Believe, Joan of Arc) who lent assistance both on instrumentation and engineering. The results of these efforts were I Do Perceive, Owen's third album.

On At Home With Owen, Mike figuratively leaves the at-home bedroom that has characterized so much of Owen's past musical presence. His step away from bedroom recording allowed for an alternative approach to the songs recorded on at Home With Owen. "I've always hated how two dimensional the other Owen albums have sounded, and I think this one's finally got a third dimension," Kinsella says. The new approach to recording involved a fraction of pre-recording at Mike's mom's house, followed by sessions at Semaphore Studios with cousin Nate Kinsella (Joan of Arc, Make Believe) and finally at Engine Studios with Brian Deck (Iron & Wine, Red Red Meat).

In July 2009, Polyvinyl Records released The Seaside EP, a collection of Owen songs previously only available as Japanese bonus tracks, as well as a track from the Association of Utopian Hologram Swallowers".

Since the release of his 2006 album, much has changed for Kinsella. During the writing process for the fifth album, New Leaves, Kinsella became both a husband and a father, adding a sense of responsibility and new direction to the personalized quality of Owen releases. As the title would suggest, New Leaves finds Kinsella building upon and branching off of the core elements of his efforts – clever lyrics over intricate guitar work – now aided by a more complex song structure and refined lyrical matter. Produced by Brian Deck (Iron & Wine, Margot & the Nuclear So and So's), Graeme Gibson (Califone, Joan of Arc), Tim Iseler (Wilco, Teenage Fanclub) and cousin Nate Kinsella, New Leaves is 10 tracks of renewal and personal growth.

In 2010, Owen released the "Abandoned Bridges" single. He has also released an EP titled O, Evelyn in April 2011. Owen's album, Ghost Town, was released on November 8, 2011. Owen's album, L'Ami du Peuple, was released on July 2, 2013.

On October 2, 2014, it was announced that Owen is releasing a covers album titled Other People's Songs. The album was released on December 2, 2014, through Polyvinyl Records. It included covers of songs from artists including Against Me!, Depeche Mode, The Promise Ring, and Lungfish amongst others.

In July 2016 he released the album The King of Whys through Polyvinyl in America and Wichita Recordings in England.

In June 2020 he released the album "The Avalanche through Polyvinyl Records.

Discography

 Owen (2001)
 No Good for No One Now (2002)
 I Do Perceive (2004)
 At Home with Owen (2006)
 New Leaves (2009)
 Ghost Town (2011)
 L'Ami du Peuple (2013)
 Other People's Songs (2014)
 The King of Whys (2016)
 The Avalanche (2020)

References

External links

Owen artist page at Polyvinyl
Lazy-i Interview: November 2002
Punknews.org Profile of Owen with reviews, interviews, related bands

Indie rock musical groups from Illinois
Musical groups from Chicago
Polyvinyl Record Co. artists
Wichita Recordings artists